The 2012 Delaware lieutenant gubernatorial election was held on November 6, 2012, coinciding with the Delaware gubernatorial election. Democratic incumbent Lieutenant Governor Matthew Denn was elected to a second term, defeating Republican nominee Sher Valenzuela in a landslide.

Candidates

Democratic Party
Matthew Denn, incumbent Lieutenant Governor

Republican Party
Sher Valenzuela

Libertarian Party
Margaret McKeown

General election results

See also
 2012 Delaware gubernatorial election

References

2012
Delaware
Lieutenant Gubernatorial